Sheryl Boyle (born November 13, 1965 in Renfrew, Ontario) is a Canadian slalom canoeist who competed from the late 1980s to the late 1990s. Competing in two Summer Olympics, she earned her best finish of 22nd in the K1 event in Barcelona in 1992.

World Cup individual podiums

References
Sports-Reference.com profile

1965 births
Canadian female canoeists
Canoeists at the 1992 Summer Olympics
Canoeists at the 1996 Summer Olympics
Living people
Olympic canoeists of Canada